Philip J. "Pud" Kaplan (born October 30, 1975) is an American entrepreneur and computer programmer who has founded several Internet companies.

He created the Fucked Company website in May 2000 and wrote the corresponding book F'd Companies in 2002.

He has subsequently created other websites and web-based ventures, including the online advertising market site AdBrite, which he founded in 2004. In June 2009, Kaplan joined Charles River Ventures as an Entrepreneur In Residence.

In July 2011, Kaplan formed ADHD Labs, an incubator for web and iPhone apps. ADHD Labs' company, TinyLetter, was acquired by MailChimp in August 2011. In 2012, Kaplan's company founded Fandalism, a social networking website for musicians. He expanded the site to offer the digital distribution of music, and in early 2013, the service was spun off under the name DistroKid.

Kaplan obtained his Bachelor of Science in 1997 from the Syracuse University School of Information Studies and delivered the convocation address at the Class of 2014 graduation ceremony. He currently resides in New York City.

References

External links
 

American Internet celebrities
1975 births
Living people
Bethesda-Chevy Chase High School alumni
Syracuse University alumni
21st-century American businesspeople